America Burning is a 1973 report written by the National Commission on Fire Prevention and Control to evaluate fire loss in the United States and to make recommendation to reduce loss and increase safety of citizens and firefighting personnel. The report concluded that fire prevention and fire safety education for the public were critical to reducing the losses associated with fires, and that firefighters also needed to be better educated for their jobs in fighting fires. As a result of the report, in 1974 the United States Congress passed the Federal Fire Prevention and Control Act of 1974 leading to the formation of the U.S. Fire Administration, the National Fire Academy, the National Fire Incident Reporting System and the Center for Fire Research within  the National Bureau of Standards. One of the most critical findings of the report was that the high death rate among American firefighters should be addressed. As a result of this report, fire fighting agencies planned life and property loss-reduction strategies for handling incidents before they occurred.

One of the outcomes of the report was the practice of architects and engineers including fire safety in the design of buildings.

Recommendations of the NCFPC

America Burning: The Report of The National Commission on Fire Prevention and Control granted ninety recommendations emphasizing fire prevention and safety education
at the local community level while incorporating safety measures to control, detect, and extinguish flammable incidences.

References

External links
 America Burning

Firefighting in the United States
1973 in the United States
History of firefighting